Vladimir Nikolayevich Plotnikov (born 6 November 1961, Gusyovka, Olkhovsky District) is a Russian political figure and a deputy of the 1st, 2nd, 3rd, 4th, 7th, and 8th State Dumas. 

In 1995, Plotnikov was granted a Candidate of Sciences degree in Agricultural Sciences. From 1984 to 1993, he worked as a chief agronomer of the Olkhovsky District. In 1993-2007, he was the deputy of the State Duma of the 1st, 2nd, 3rd, 4th convocations.

Initially, Plotnikov was a member of the Agrarian Party of Russia, but in October 2008, he joined the United Russia instead. From April 2004 to 2008 he served as chairman of the Agrarian Party after Mikhail Lapshin stepped down.

On 1 March 2009 he was elected deputy of the Volgograd Oblast Duma. In 2009-2014, Plotnkov was a member of the Federation Council. In 2016 and 2021, he was re-elected for the 7th and 8th State Dumas respectively.

References

1961 births
Living people
Agrarian Party of Russia politicians
United Russia politicians
21st-century Russian politicians
Eighth convocation members of the State Duma (Russian Federation)
Seventh convocation members of the State Duma (Russian Federation)
Members of the Federation Council of Russia (after 2000)
Fourth convocation members of the State Duma (Russian Federation)
Third convocation members of the State Duma (Russian Federation)
Second convocation members of the State Duma (Russian Federation)
First convocation members of the State Duma (Russian Federation)
People from Volgograd Oblast